Terreon Deautri Gully (born December 28, 1972) is an American drummer from East St. Louis, Illinois.

Career 

Gully has performed with various musicians and genres, including the Christian McBride Band, saxophonist Ron Blake, vibraphonist Stefon Harris and Latin band Yerba Buena.

Gully was the Professor of Drumset at University of Manitoba in Winnipeg, Manitoba, Canada from 2008 until 2010.

Discography 
2020 - Michael Olatuja: Lagos Pepper Soup
2006 − Christian McBride: Live at Tonic
2003 − Christian McBride: Vertical Vision
2001 – Jacky Terrasson & Stefon Harris: Kindred
2000 – Jacky Terrasson: A Paris...

References

External links 
 
 
 Drummerworld

1972 births
People from East St. Louis, Illinois
American jazz drummers
Jazz musicians from Illinois
Musicians from Georgia (U.S. state)
Musicians from New York (state)
Living people
21st-century American drummers